Hirudinidae is a family of leeches belonging to the order Arhynchobdellida.

Genera
The Interim Register of Marine and Non-marine Genera lists:
 Hirudo Linnaeus, 1758
 Limnatis Moquin-Tandon, 1827
 Limnobdella Blanchard, 1893
 Ornithobdella Benham, 1909
 Pintobdella Caballero, 1937
 Poecilobdella Blanchard, 1893
Genera of uncertain placement
 Asiaticobdella Richardson, 1969
 Aulastoma Moquin-Tandon, 1827
 Dinobdella Moore, 1927
 Diplobdella Moore, 1902
 Hexabdella Verrill, 1872
 Myxobdella Oka, 1917
 Oxyptychus Grube, 1850
 Potamobdella Caballero

References

External links

Annelid families
Leeches